William J. Hartnett (April 3, 1932 – June 17, 2016) was an American politician.

Hackett was born in New Castle, Pennsylvania and moved with his family to Orrville, Ohio. Hartnell served in the United States Navy during the Korean War. He graduate from Kent State University and West Virginia University. He was a high school coach and teacher in Mansfield, Ohio. He was a former member of the Ohio House of Representatives, serving from 1998 to 2006. He died at OhioHealth Mansfield Hospital in Mansfield, Ohio.

References

Democratic Party members of the Ohio House of Representatives
1932 births
2016 deaths
Politicians from Mansfield, Ohio
People from New Castle, Pennsylvania
Military personnel from Ohio
Kent State University alumni
West Virginia University alumni
Schoolteachers from Ohio
21st-century American politicians